Anilio (Greek: Ανήλιο) may refer to several villages in Greece:

Anilio, Elis, a village in Elis
Anilio, Ioannina, a village in the Ioannina regional unit
Anilio, Magnesia, a village in Magnesia